Aftab Shivdasani (born 25 June 1978) is an Indian actor, producer and model known for his works in Bollywood and also working for Tamil and Kannada film industry. 
Shivdasani was selected as the Farex baby at the age of 14 months and eventually appeared in many TV commercials. He started his career as a child artist in films like Mr. India (1987), Shahenshah (1988), ChaalBaaz (1989), Awwal Number (1990), C.I.D. (1990) and Insaniyat (1994).

In 1999, he made his adult debut in Ram Gopal Varma's Mast, for which he received the Zee Cine Award for Best Male Debut and Star Screen Award for Most Promising Newcomer- Male. Subsequently, he featured in several commercially successful films, including, Kasoor (2001) for which he received Zee Cine Award for Best Actor in a Negative Role and a nomination for Filmfare Best Villain Award, Kya Yehi Pyaar Hai (2002), Awara Paagal Deewana (2002), Hungama (2003), Masti (2004). His debut film in Tamil cinema was Bhaskar Oru Rascal (2018). He made his debut in Kannada cinema with the commercial hit movie Kotigobba 3  (2021).

Personal life 
Shivdasani was born in Mumbai in a Sindhi Hindu Family to Prem and Putli Shivdasani. His mother is an Irani Zoroastrian. He studied at St. Xavier's High School, (Fort) located at Lokamanya Tilak Marg in Mumbai. He then graduated from H. R.College of Commerce in Mumbai. In 2012, he was engaged to Nin Dusanj, a London-based Punjabi who grew up in London and later moved to Hong Kong, working within the advertising and luxury branding industries in Asia. On 5 June 2014, he married Nin Dusanj at a private ceremony attended only by both their families. They have a daughter Nevaeh born in 2020.

Career

1987–1994: Child roles 
Shivdasani was selected as the Farex baby (baby food brand) at age 14 months and from that point on he appeared in many TV commercials. He made his Bollywood debut as a child actor in Mr. India (1987), then appearing in films such as Awwal Number, Shahenshah, ChaalBaaz and Insaniyat. He also played the child role for Inspector Vijaykumar Srivastav in the 1988 film 'Shahenshah', who would later be played by Amitabh Bachchan for the remainder of the film.

1999–2008: Switch to adult roles and breakthrough 

Shivdasani continued appearing in commercials until the age of 19 when he was offered a lead role in director Ram Gopal Varma's Mast opposite Urmila Matondkar while still studying at H.R. College. Shivdasani made his debut as an adult opposite Matondkar in Mast. The film became an instant flop although Shivdasani won the Zee Cine Award for Best Male Debut and the Star Screen Award for Most Promising Newcomer – Male for his performance in Mast. He earned critical acclaim for his performance. Mohammad Ali Ikram of Planet Bollywood praised his performance and wrote: "Newcomer Aftab Shivdasani comes across as a bit young and aimless when the movie opens, but as you watch the proceedings, you'll learn that this bit of casting makes perfect sense considering Kittu's immaturity and innocence."

In 2001, Shivdasani made his comeback to acting with his second film, Vikram Bhatt’s Kasoor opposite the debutant Lisa Ray. Shivdasani played a negative role and shot to instant fame with his portrayal of Shekhar Saxena, a well-known journalist, who murders his wife. His performance in the film earned him a nomination for the Filmfare Best Villain Award and a Zee Cine Award for Best Actor in a Negative Role. Taran Adarsh of Bollywood Hungama noticed the improvement in his acting and praised his performance. "Aftab, as the suave publishing magnate, catches you unaware with a performance that is first-rate. His characterisation is dissimilar from the one he played in his debut-making venture Mast. His work should catapult him to the league of genteel artists." His next release of that year saw him paired with Ram Gopal Varma again after Mast in Love Ke Liye Kuch Bhi Karega, in which Shivdasani starred in a supporting role opposite Saif Ali Khan, Fardeen Khan, Twinkle Khanna and Sonali Bendre. Shivdasani's performance was applauded by Taran Adarsh and considered to be better than the other two heroes. Taran Adarsh wrote "Aftab plays to the gallery and gives a good account of himself. Aftab has an edge over the other two heroes because his character is mass appealing. His scenes with Johny Lever are simply superb." However, the film failed at the box office. His last release of the year was Rajiv Rai's Pyaar Ishq Aur Mohabbat, in which Shivdasani played Taj Bharadwaj, one of the three lead roles with the debutant Arjun Rampal and Suniel Shetty opposite Kirti Reddy. Shivdasani was praised by Taran Adarsh. "Aftab Shivdasani has an edge thanks to his lovable characterization. He is natural." Pankaj Shukla of SmasHits wrote "Aftab is impressive as usual and is fast maturing as an actor."

In 2002, Shivdasani's first two films Koi Mere Dil Se Poochhe opposite debutant Esha Deol was a failure but Kya Yehi Pyaar Hai opposite Ameesha Patel was successful at the box office. His third release of that year was Rajkumar Kohli's multi-starrer supernatural horror Jaani Dushman: Ek Anokhi Kahani that was a disaster. His fourth film of 2002 was the multi-starrer action comedy Awara Paagal Deewana, that proved to be a successful movie and became the seventh highest grosser movie of that year. It was an average grosser. His final release of that year was Pyaasa.

Shivdasani had some failures in 2003 with the multi-starrer Darna Mana Hai, which was a  commercial failure at the box office but it was critically successful. His role of Purab, a young college student who has the ability to stop and move people, was critically praised. His next release was Priyadarshan's comedy film Hungama opposite Akshaye Khanna and the debutant Rimi Sen, which was his biggest success of that year. His third and final release of that year was Footpath opposite Bipasha Basu, Rahul Dev and debutant Emraan Hashmi, which failed to do well at the box office.

Shivdasani's first two releases of 2004 were Suno Sasurjee opposite Ameesha Patel, and Muskaan opposite Gracy Singh. His third release of that year was Indra Kumar's comedy film Masti, in which he starred opposite Vivek Oberoi, Ritesh Deshmukh, Amrita Rao, Genelia D'Souza, Tara Sharma, Lara Dutta and Ajay Devgan. The film became a hit. His last release of that year was Shukriya: Till Death Do Us Apart opposite Anupam Kher and Shriya Saran.

In 2005, Shivdasani's films included Mr Ya Miss opposite Antara Mali and Koi Aap Sa opposite Anita Hassanandani Reddy and Dipannita Sharma. The former was a flop while the latter was average at the box office. All of Shivdasani's films, especially Ankahee, were failures in 2006. Shivdasani found failures with multi-starrer films in 2007 and 2008.

2009–present: Aao Wish Karein and recent projects 
In 2009, Shivdasani acted in Aao Wish Karein, the first film produced under his production company, Rising Sun Entertainment. He helped co-write the script and also played the lead character, Mickey. The same year, Shivdasani appeared in Acid Factory. In 2011, Shivdasani played the lead role in the comedy film Bin Bulaye Baraati opposite Priyanka Kothari. Shivdasani's next release was 2012 super-hit 1920: The Evil Returns in which he played the lead role opposite Twinkle Bajpai. His next film Grand Masti, a sequel to the 2004 blockbuster Masti was also a huge success like the original grossing over 100crores at the box office. In January 2016 part 3 of the hit franchise Kyaa Kool Hai Hum was released where Aftab starred alongside Tusshar Kapoor the film was a hit at the box office. In July 2016 the third instalment of the super hit Masti series, Great Grand Masti was released.
In 2021 he took part in a commercially successful sandalwood, kannada movie kotigobba 3 as a cop(police officer). Aftab Shivdasani entered the web space for the first time with, “Poison 2”.

In 2021, Shivdasani starred as Vijay Kumar, a RAW officer in Special Ops 1.5: The Himmat Story, the sequel to Neeraj Panday’s hit series Special Ops on Disney+ Hotstar. His performance received commercial and critical appreciation from all and was also hailed as the surprise package of the second season.

Awards 

|- 
|rowspan="2"|2000 
|rowspan="2"|Mast 
| Star Screen Award for Most Promising Newcomer - Male 
|  
|- 
| Zee Cine Award for Best Male Debut
|  
|- 
|rowspan="3"|2002 
|rowspan="3"|Kasoor 
| Filmfare Award for Best Performance in a Negative Role 
| 
|- 
| Zee Cine Award for Best Actor in a Negative Role 
|  
|- 
| Screen Weekly Awards for Best Performance in a Negative Role
|  
|- 
| 2005 
| Masti 
| Bollywood Movie Award for Best Comedian 
| 
|- 
|}

Filmography

Television

See also 

 List of Indian film actors

References

External links 

 
 
 Tamil Movie News : Aftab Shivdasani 

1978 births
Living people
Indian male child actors
Indian Hindus
Male actors from Mumbai
Male actors in Hindi cinema
Sindhi people
20th-century Indian male actors
21st-century Indian male actors
Screen Awards winners
Zee Cine Awards winners